Mustafa Aslanturk (born in Cyprus) is a Cypriot fashion designer who currently resides in London, England.

Aslanturk graduated from the London College of Fashion in 2005 and had previously studied Interior Architecture in Cyprus. The architectural influence is very much apparent in his Autumn/Winter 07/08.

References

External links
Vogue: Mustafa Aslanturk 
Moda Turkiye: Mustafa Aslanturk

Turkish Cypriot emigrants to the United Kingdom
Turkish fashion designers
Living people
Year of birth missing (living people)
Alumni of the London College of Fashion